Bonne Femme Creek may refer to:

Bonne Femme Creek (Boone County, Missouri), a tributary of the Missouri River in Missouri
Bonne Femme Creek (Howard County, Missouri), a tributary of the Missouri River in Missouri